Abercrombie Crests are a cluster of rock summits rising to  in the north part of Darley Hills, Churchill Mountains,  south-southeast of Mount Deleon. Named by Advisory Committee on Antarctic Names (US-ACAN) after Thomas J. Abercrombie of the National Geographic Magazine Foreign Editorial Staff, 1957–90, who was on assignment in Antarctica, 1957–58. One of several features in Darley Hills that are named for NGM staff.

Cliffs of the Ross Dependency
Shackleton Coast